This is a list of seasons completed by the Arizona State Sun Devils men's college basketball team.

Seasons

References

 
Arizona State Sun Devils
Arizona State Sun Devils basketball